Hugh C. Whiteford was an American politician from Maryland. He served as a member of the Maryland House of Delegates, representing Harford County from 1847 to 1849.

Whiteford served as a member of the Maryland House of Delegates, representing Harford County, from 1847 to 1849.

References

Year of birth unknown
Year of death missing
People from Harford County, Maryland
Members of the Maryland House of Delegates